Friseria caieta is a moth of the family Gelechiidae. It is found in North America, where it has been recorded from Arizona.

The wingspan is 12–14 mm. The forewings are white, dark brown, and orange brown, many brown scales with grey bases. The hindwings are fuscous.

References

Moths described in 1966
Friseria